Adam Rita (born September 21, 1947) is a gridiron football coach & general manager, most notably in the Canadian Football League. He has served as the head coach of the Toronto Argonauts, Ottawa Rough Riders, and BC Lions and as general manager of the Lions and Argonauts. Since leaving the CFL in 2012, Rita has been coaching American football in Europe. Coaching the Bergamo Lions in the Italian Football League, Calanda Broncos in Switzerland, Prague Panthers in Czech, Berlin Adler Germany, Barcelona Dragons in Spain, in the newly formed European League of Football in 2021 and  returned again to the Bergamo Lions in 2022.

College playing career
From 1965 to 1968, Rita attended Boise State University playing center for the Boise State Broncos.

NCAA coaching career
From 1969 to 1976, Rita continued his tenure with the Boise State Broncos, serving as an assistant coach & recruiting director. After leaving Boise State, Rita's U.S. college coaching stints continued with the UNLV Rebels & Hawaii Rainbow Warriors.

Coaching & GM career in Canadian football
In 1983, Rita began his first professional coaching tenure as the offensive co-ordinator for the B.C. Lions under head coach Don Matthews.

In 1989, Rita left the CFL to join the coaching staff of the UBC Thunderbirds of CIAU football.

In 1990, Rita rejoined Matthews in Toronto as offensive coordinator for the Toronto Argonauts. In 1991, after Matthews' departure, Rita became a first time CFL head coach for the Argonauts with whom he won his first and only Grey Cup championship as a head coach in that same year. In September 1992, after a 3–8 start to the season, Rita was fired as Argonauts head coach.

In 1993, Rita joined the Edmonton Eskimos as their offensive coordinator. The team went on to win the 81st Grey Cup that year.

In 1994, Rita became the head coach of the Ottawa Rough Riders. The team went on to finish their season with a 4-14.

In 1995, Rita resigned as the Rough Riders' head coach to become the offensive coordinator for one of the new U.S. expansion teams in the CFL, the Memphis Mad Dogs.

In 1996, Rita reunited with Matthews, rejoining the Argonauts as their offensive coordinator in 1996. The team would go on to win the 84th Grey Cup that year.

In 1997, Rita joined the B.C. Lions as both their new head coach and general manager. In 1998, Rita relinquished his head coaching responsibilities halfway through the season, focusing exclusively on his general manager duties. In 2002, after six games into the season, Rita took over as their interim head coach.

In 2003, Rita returned to the Toronto Argonauts as their offensive coordinator serving under head coach Pinball Clemons who he used to coach. In 2004, Rita was promoted to General Manager and Vice President of Football Operations of the Argonauts. Toronto won the 92nd Grey Cup in his first year on the job, but managed only a 48–60 record after that. Rita's contract was not renewed following the 2010 season and he was replaced by head coach Jim Barker.

During his CFL tenure, Rita won 6 Grey Cups in 8 appearances in his capacities as head coach, offensive coordinator, and general manager.

In 2012, Rita retired from the CFL and turned to high school football coaching, becoming an assistant coach & offensive coordinator with the Trinity College School football team in Port Hope, Ontario.

In 2016, Rita moved from Trinity College School to the "Football North" program at Clarkson Secondary School in Mississauga as their assistant coach and offensive coordinator. In 2019, Rita was elevated to assistant head coach.

Coaching career in Europe
Rita discovered Europlayers which serves as a job website for European sports. This led to his first European coaching job in 2012 as the head coach for the Prague Panthers in the Czech Republic, where the team finished as Czech league runner up losing in the Czech Bowl championship game. The Panthers also competed in the Austrian Football League top level.

In 2013–14, Rita served as the head coach of the Calanda Broncos in Switzerland Nationalliga A (American football) winning the Swiss Bowl championship in 2013 and finishing runner up losing in the Swiss bowl in 2014. The team also competed in the European Football League. 

In 2017–19, Rita served as the head coach and offensive coordinator of the Bergamo Lions of the Italian Football League IFL.

In 2020, Rita was named as the new head coach for the Berlin Adler of the German Football League 2. Unfortunately, the 2020 season was not played due to the COVID-19 pandemic.

In 2021, Rita was named as the first ever head coach for the Spanish-based team Gladiators Football, later rebranded as Barcelona Dragons, of the newly formed European League of Football.

In 2022, Rita returned to the Bergamo Lions in Italy as head coach. The 2022 Lions are competed in the second tier of the Italian League.
The Lions qualified to return to the highest level league in Italy (IFL) for the 2023 season.

Personal life
Rita grew up on Kaua'i, Hawai'i and as a young boy, he was a member of a canoe club and appeared paddling a canoe in the wedding scene of the Elvis Presley movie Blue Hawaii.

Rita is married to his wife Judit who is from Hungary. He also has two sons, Kevin and Harrison, and two grandchildren, Seth and Jennifer. As of 2020, Rita and his wife reside in Mississauga, Ontario.

CFL GM record

CFL coaching record

References

External links
 Toronto Argonauts profile
 ADAM RITA CONTINUING PASSION FOR COACHING IN RETIREMENT (CFL.ca column on Adam Rita)

1947 births
BC Lions coaches
BC Lions general managers
Boise State Broncos football players
Boise State Broncos football coaches
Edmonton Elks coaches
Living people
Ottawa Rough Riders coaches
Hawaii Rainbow Warriors football coaches
Native Hawaiian people
Naturalized citizens of Canada
People from Kauai County, Hawaii
Sportspeople from Hawaii
Toronto Argonauts coaches
Toronto Argonauts general managers
UNLV Rebels football coaches
Players of American football from Hawaii
Coaches of American football from Hawaii
Canadian expatriate sportspeople in Germany
Canadian expatriate sportspeople in Spain
UBC Thunderbirds football coaches
Memphis Mad Dogs coaches
European League of Football coaches
Canadian expatriate sportspeople in the Czech Republic
Canadian expatriate sportspeople in Switzerland
Canadian expatriate sportspeople in Italy
American expatriate players of American football